GJ 526 (Lalande 25372, Wolf 498) is a red dwarf star in the northern constellation of Boötes. It has an apparent visual magnitude of 8.5, which is too faint to be seen with the naked eye.

History of observations
This star is known at least from 1801, when it was included to Lalande's stellar catalogue Histoire céleste française. In 1847 edition of Lalande's catalogue by Francis Baily it was assigned number 25372, since it sometimes designated as Lalande 25372 or LAL 25372.

High proper motion of this star and its large parallax were known at least from 1911, when Frank Schlesinger published a paper where he announced its parallax  and mentioned its proper motion value of 2.3 arcsec. In 1919, German astronomer Max Wolf included GJ 526 in his catalogue of high proper motion stars, giving it the identifier 498.

Properties
GJ 526 is a flare star, which means it undergoes sporadic increases in brightness of up to 1–6 magnitudes. It is a main sequence red dwarf with a stellar classification of M1.5 V. GJ 526 is smaller than the Sun, with 28% of the mass and 58.2% of the radius. It shines with just 1.1% of the luminosity of the Sun, with its stellar atmosphere radiating at an effective temperature of 3,474 K.

GJ 526 has been examined for an excess of radiation in the infrared. The presence of an infrared excess can be taken as an indication of a debris disk orbiting the star. However, no such excess was discovered around GJ 526.

References

Notes

Boötes
0526
M-type main-sequence stars
119850
Flare stars
Durchmusterung objects
067155